Keila may refer to:

Places in Estonia
Keila, town and urban municipality in Harju County
Keila JK, football club based in Keila
Keila Parish, former rural municipality in Harju County
Keila-Joa, small borough in Lääne-Harju Parish, Harju County
Keila (river), river in Estonia
Keila Waterfall

Other places
Keila, Germany, municipality in Saale-Orla-Kreis, Thuringia, Germany
Keilah, ancient city in Israel

Other
Keila Costa (born 1983), Brazilian long jumper and triple jumper
Keila Jedrik, fictional character from the Frank Herbert's 1977 novel The Dosadi Experiment
Cyclone Keila of the 2011 North Indian Ocean cyclone season
Khemara Keila FC, Cambodian football club based in Phnom Penh